The 2004 United States presidential election in Montana took place on November 2, 2004, and was part of the 2004 United States presidential election. Voters chose three representatives, or electors to the Electoral College, who voted for president and vice president.

Montana was won by incumbent President George W. Bush by a 20.5% margin of victory. Prior to the election, all 12 news organizations considered this a state Bush would win, or otherwise considered as a safe red state. 

Montana was 1 of 9 states to only back George H. W. Bush once that was won twice by George W. Bush.

Primaries
 2004 Montana Democratic presidential primary

Campaign

Predictions
There were 12 news organizations who made state-by-state predictions of the election. Here are their last predictions before election day.

 D.C. Political Report: Solid Republican
 Associated Press: Solid Bush
 CNN: Bush
Cook Political Report: Solid Republican
 Newsweek: Solid Bush
New York Times: Solid Bush
 Rasmussen Reports: Bush
 Research 2000: Solid Bush
Washington Post: Bush
Washington Times: Solid Bush
Zogby International: Bush
 Washington Dispatch: Bush

Polling
Only a few pre-election polls were taken here. Bush won each one of them with a double-digit margin and with at least 54% of the vote. The final 3 polling average showed him leading 55% to 35%.

Fundraising
Bush raised $385,635. Kerry raised $145,679.

Advertising and visits
Neither campaign advertised or visited this state during the fall campaign.

Analysis
Bush's key to victory was winning the highly populated Yellowstone County with 60% along with the majority of other counties. Kerry only won six counties in the state, including swinging Missoula County and his best performance in the Democratic stronghold of Deer Lodge County.

Results

By county

Counties that flipped from Republican to Democratic
Missoula (Largest city: Missoula)

By congressional district
Due to the state's low population, only one congressional district is allocated. This district, called the At-Large district, because it covers the entire state, and thus is equivalent to the statewide election results.

Electors

Technically the voters of Montana cast their ballots for electors: representatives to the Electoral College. Montana is allocated 3 electors because it has 1 congressional districts and 2 senators. All candidates who appear on the ballot or qualify to receive write-in votes must submit a list of 3 electors, who pledge to vote for their candidate and his or her running mate. Whoever wins the majority of votes in the state is awarded all 3 electoral votes. Their chosen electors then vote for president and vice president. Although electors are pledged to their candidate and running mate, they are not obligated to vote for them. An elector who votes for someone other than his or her candidate is known as a faithless elector.

The electors of each state and the District of Columbia met on December 13, 2004, to cast their votes for president and vice president. The Electoral College itself never meets as one body. Instead the electors from each state and the District of Columbia met in their respective capitols.

The following were the members of the Electoral College from the state. All three were pledged for Bush/Cheney.
 Jack Galt
 Thelma Baker
 John Brenden

See also
 United States presidential elections in Montana
 Presidency of George W. Bush

References

Montana
2004
Presidential